Vranjače  is a village in the municipality of Tomislavgrad in Canton 10, the Federation of Bosnia and Herzegovina, Bosnia and Herzegovina.

Demographics 

According to the 2013 census, its population was 24, all Croats.f>

Footnotes

Bibliography 

 

Populated places in Tomislavgrad